Sprint may refer to:

Aerospace
Spring WS202 Sprint, a Canadian aircraft design
Sprint (missile), an anti-ballistic missile

Automotive and motorcycle
Alfa Romeo Sprint, automobile produced by Alfa Romeo between 1976 and 1989
Chevrolet Sprint, a rebadged version of the Suzuki Swift
GMC Sprint/Caballero, the GMC version of the Chevrolet El Camino produced from 1971-1987
Motorcycle drag racing, a standing-start sprint contest between two participants
Sprint car racing, auto racing with small, high-powered vehicles
Sprint Cup Series, the  top racing series of NASCAR
Sprint Expressway, the main expressway network in Klang Valley, Malaysia
Triumph Dolomite Sprint, produced during the 1970s

Software and gaming
Sprint (software development), a development phase in software development
See also Sprint (scrum) for how sprints are used specifically in the Scrum development methodology
Sprint (word processor), software published by Borland
Sprint 2, a series of racing video games from Atari

Sports
Eastern Sprints, a rowing championship
Sprint (track cycling), a track event involving a one-on-one match race between opponents who start next to each other
Sprint (running), running at top speed over short distance
Sprints, a form of flat racing of horses
Sprint (Formula One), event at some Formula One races since 2021

Other uses
Sprint Corporation, a former major telecommunications company in the United States
Sprint (album) a 1982 jazz album by the Red Rodney Ira Sullivan Quintet
Sprint 95, a French sailboat design
Systolic Blood Pressure Intervention Trial (SPRINT), a clinical trial in high blood pressure treatment
Sprint (West Midlands), a bus rapid transit scheme in England

See also 

 Sprinter (disambiguation)